In modern English, sycophant denotes an "insincere flatterer" and is used to refer to someone practising sycophancy (i.e., insincere flattery to gain advantage). The word has its origin in the legal system of Classical Athens. Most legal cases of the time were brought by private litigants as there was  no police force and only a limited number of officially appointed public prosecutors. By the fifth century BC this practice had given rise to abuse by "sycophants": litigants who brought unjustified prosecutions. The word retains the same meaning ('slanderer') in Modern Greek, French, (where it also can mean 'informer') and Italian. In modern English, the meaning of the word has shifted to its present usage.

Etymology
The origin of the Ancient Greek word  is a matter of debate, but disparages the unjustified accuser who has in some way perverted the legal system. 

The original etymology of the word (// 'fig', and // 'to show') "revealer of figs"—has been the subject of extensive scholarly speculation and conjecture. Plutarch appears to be the first to have suggested that the source of the term was in laws forbidding the exportation of figs, and that those who leveled the accusation against another of illegally exporting figs were therefore called sycophants. Athenaeus provided a similar explanation. Blackstone's Commentaries repeats this story, but adds an additional take—that there were laws making it a capital offense to break into a garden and steal figs, and that the law was so odious that informers were given the name sycophants. 

A different explanation of the origin of the term by Shadwell was that the sycophant refers to the manner in which figs are harvested, by shaking the tree and revealing the fruit hidden among the leaves. The sycophant, by making false accusations, makes the accused yield up their fruit. The Encyclopædia Britannica Eleventh Edition listed these and other explanations, including that the making of false accusations was an insult to the accused in the nature of "showing the fig", an "obscene gesture of phallic significance" or, alternatively that the false charges were often so insubstantial as to not amount to the worth of a fig. 

Generally, scholars have dismissed these explanations as inventions, long after the original meaning had been lost. Danielle Allen suggests that the term was "slightly obscene", connoting a kind of perversion, and may have had a web of meanings derived from the symbolism of figs in ancient Greek culture, ranging from the improper display of one's "figs" by being overly aggressive in pursuing a prosecution, the unseemly revealing of the private matters of those accused of wrongdoing, to the inappropriate timing of harvesting figs when they are unripe.

In Athenian culture

The traditional view is that the opprobrium against sycophants was attached to the bringing of an unjustified complaint, hoping either to obtain the payment for a successful case, or to blackmail the defendant into paying a bribe to drop the case. Other scholars have suggested that the sycophant, rather than being disparaged for being motivated by profit, was instead viewed as a vexatious litigant who was over-eager to prosecute, and who had no personal stake in the underlying dispute, but brings up old charges unrelated to himself long after the event. Sycophants included those who profited from using their position as citizens for profit. For instance, one could hire a sycophant to bring a charge against one's enemies, or to take a wide variety of actions of an official nature with the authorities, including introducing decrees, acting as an advocate or a witness, bribing ecclesiastical or civil authorities and juries, or other questionable things, with which one did not want to be personally associated. Sycophants were viewed as uncontrolled and parasitic, lacking proper regard for truth or for justice in a matter, using their education and skill to destroy opponents for profit in matters where they had no stake, lacking even the convictions of politicians, and having no sense of serving the public good.

Orations

The charge of sycophancy against a litigant was a serious matter, and the authors of two surviving oratories, "Against the Grain Dealers" (author Lysias) and "Against Leocrates" (author Lycurgus), defend themselves against charges that they are sycophants because they are prosecuting cases as private citizens in circumstances where they have no personal stake in the underlying dispute. In each instance, the lack of personal involvement appears to have been the crux of the accusation of sycophancy against them, the merits of the cases being separate matters from whether they had a right to bring them.

Measures to suppress sycophants
Efforts were made to discourage or suppress sycophants, including imposing fines on litigants who failed to obtain at least one fifth of the jury's votes, or for abandoning a case after it had begun (as would occur if the sycophant was bribed to drop the matter), and authorizing the prosecution of men for being sycophants. Statutes of Limitation were specifically adopted to try to prevent sycophancy.

Satires
Sycophants are better illustrated through the satires of Aristophanes. In The Acharnians, a Megarian attempting to sell his daughters is confronted by a sycophant who accuses him of illegally attempting to sell foreign goods; and a Boeotian purchases a sycophant as a typical Athenian product that he cannot obtain at home. A sycophant appears as a character in The Birds. One of his lost plays had, as its principal theme, an attack against a sycophant. In Wealth, the character, Sycophant, defends his role as a necessity in supporting the laws and preventing wrongdoing.

Modern Greece

In legal terms, Article 362 of the Greek Penal Code defines defamation "whoever who with in any way claims or spreads for someone else a fact that could harm that person's honor or reputation", whereas slanderous defamation is when the fact is a lie, and the person who claims or spreads it knows that. The first case is punishable with up to two years' imprisonment or a fine, whereas slanderous defamation is punishable with at least three months' imprisonment and a fine.

Shift in meaning in modern English

The word sycophant entered the English and French languages in the mid-16th century, and originally had the same meaning in English and French as in Greek, a false accuser. Today, in Greek and French it retains the original meaning.

The meaning in English has changed over time, however, and came to mean an insincere flatterer. The common thread in the older and current meanings is that the sycophant is in both instances portrayed as a kind of parasite, speaking falsely and insincerely in the accusation or the flattery for gain. The Greek plays often combined in one single character the elements of the parasite and the sycophant, and the natural similarities of the two closely related types led to the shift in the meaning of the word. The sycophant in both meanings can also be viewed as two sides of the same coin: the same person currying one's favor by insincere flattery is also spreading false tales and accusations behind one's back. 

In Renaissance English, the word was used in both senses and meanings, that of the Greek informer, and the current sense of a "flattering parasite", with both being cast as enemies—not only of those they wrong, but also of the person or state that they ostensibly serve.

Related expressions

Sycophancy is insincere flattery given to gain advantage from a superior. A user of sycophancy is referred to as a sycophant or a “yes-man.”

Alternative phrases are often used such as:

See also

Further reading

References

External links 

Etymologies
Classical Athens
Greek words and phrases
Interpersonal relationships
Human behavior
Bullying
Ancient Greece